Tavilehgah may refer to:
 Tavilehgah-e Olya
 Tavilehgah-e Sofla